Jayabhaya or Jayabaya (Javanese spelled: Ratu Jayabaya) was the Javanese King of the Kediri Kingdom in East Java, Indonesia which ruled around 1135-1159 CE. With the title of abhiseka used is Sri Maharaja Sang Mapanji Jayabhaya Sri Warmeswara Madhusudana Awataranindita Suhtrisingha Parakrama Uttunggadewa. The reign of King Jayabhaya is considered the heyday of the Kediri Kingdom. 
 
King Jayabaya is credited with reunification of the Kediri kingdom following a split due to the death of his predecessor Airlangga. King Jayabaya was known for his just and prosperous rule, and reputed to have been an incarnation of the Hindu deity Vishnu. King Jayabaya epitomized the archetypal Ratu Adil: the just king reborn in the dark age of suffering "Jaman Edan" (Madness Era) to restore the Jaman Raharja: social justice, order, and harmony in the world, as Javanese believed in a cyclical history of alternating prosperity epochs of (Jaman Raharja) followed an era of suffering (Jaman edan), to cycle back to an era of prosperity (Jaman Raharja).

Jabaya termed his kingdom Widarba, meaning a thousand cities in Pamenang, modern Kediri Regency. Intertwined between fact and myth are records that his father Gendrayana the Revolutionary, claimed to be a  descendant of Pandavas as being son of Yudayana: the son of Parikshit: the son of Abhimanyu: the son of Arjuna from the family Pandavas.
From Jayaba's queen consort Dewi Sara wife were born all daughters Jaya Amijaya, Dewi Pramesti, Dewi Pramuni and Dewi Sasanti. Jaya Amijaya was married to Queen consort Astradarma Pramesti Yawastina king and birthed King of Anglingdarma: Malawapati.

Jayabaya abdicated in old age and sought a life of meditation as a Hindu recluse, informing a moksha he was the incarnation of vishnu, in the village of Menang, in Pagu sub-district of Kediri Regency, until the modern era still considered a sacred pilgrimage site, according to Kejawen belief system. Sukarno and Suharto both meditated at length in Menang to attain an air of kingly legitimacy, supernatural abilities, Jayabaya's blessings and/or powers.

Prophecies

Ratu Jayabaya is most famous for his oracles or prophesies attributed to him, namely the Serat Jayabaya Musarar, Serat Pranitiwakya, and some debatable others. The mangala (prologue) of the famous Kakawin Bhāratayuddha names King Jayabaya as the patron of the two poets, Mpu Sedah and Mpu Panuluh who were the authors of the work. Jayabaya is also attributed as author of the Prelambang Jayabaya, a prophetic book that played an important role in the Japanese occupation. 

According to a selectively abridged set of stanzas within a Jayabaya prophesy (all are extremely long epic poems): 
The Javanese would be ruled by whites for 3 centuries and by yellow dwarfs for the life span of a maize plant prior to the return of the Ratu Adil: whose name must contain at least one syllable of the Javanese Nata Nagara.

When Japan occupied the Netherlands East Indies, in the first weeks of 1942, many Indonesians danced in the streets, welcoming the Japanese army as the fulfillment of the prophecy ascribed to Jayabaya, who foretold the day when white men would one day establish their rule on Java and oppress the people for many years – but they would be driven out by the arrival of yellow men from the north. These yellow dwarves, Joyoboyo had predicted, would remain for one crop cycle (3 1/2 months, which translated as 3 1/2 years of Japanese occupation), and after that Java would be freed from foreign domination. To most of the Javanese, Japan was a liberator: the prophecy had been fulfilled.

The Japanese freed Indonesian nationalists from Dutch prisons and hired them as civil servants and administrators. In the waning days of 1944, however, it was clear that Japan could not win the war. The Japanese officially handed its authority over to Indonesia to be independent on 9 August 1945, and the commander of Japan's Southeast Asian forces appointed future President Sukarno as chairman of the preparatory committee for Indonesian independence. As one account of Indonesian history puts it, "With the minor exception that three crops had been harvested, Jayabaya's prophecy had been realized."

Many believe that the time for the arrival of a new Ratu Adil is near (as the prophecies put it, "when iron wagons could drive without horses and ships could sail through the sky"), and that he will come to rescue and reunite Indonesia after an acute crisis, ushering in the dawn of a new golden age.

References

Further reading
 J.A.B. Wiselius, "Djåjå Båjå: zijn leven en profeteën" Bijdragen tot de Taal, Land-, en Volkenkunde XIX, 1872. pp.172-217.
 Ramalan Jayabaya Musarar | Alang-Alang Kumitir
 Ibnu Khan al Latif: Serat Pranitiwakya
Kediri Kingdom
Indonesian Hindu monarchs
History of East Java
Indonesian Hindu religious leaders
Medieval Hindu religious leaders
12th-century Indonesian people

map-bms:Serat Jayabaya